Omorgus persuberosus is a species of hide beetle in the subfamily Omorginae.

References

persuberosus
Beetles described in 1962